Qatar is an Islamic state with multi-religious minorities like most of the Persian Gulf countries with waves of migration over the last 30 years. Muslims form 65.5% of the Qatari population, followed by Hindus at 15.4%, Christians at 14.2%, Buddhists at 3.3% and the rest 1.9% of the population follow other religions or are unaffiliated. Qatar is also home to numerous other religions mostly from the Middle East and Asia.

The country has also hosted numerous interfaith dialogue conferences.

Islam 
 
The state religion in Qatar is Islam. Most Qataris belong to the Sunni sect of Islam. Shiites comprise around 10% of Qatar's Muslim population. Religious policy is set by the Ministry of Islamic Affairs and Islamic instruction is compulsory for Muslims in all state-sponsored schools.

The state mosque is the Mohammed Bin Abdul Wahab mosque, which is located in the Lejbailat neighbourhood and was designed by renowned Qatari architect Ibrahim Jaidah, drawing on traditional Qatari architecture.

The Abdulla Bin Zaid Al Mahmoud Islamic Cultural Center is located in the Al Souq neighbourhood of Doha, adjacent to Souq Waqif. The center provides Arabic lessons to beginners and intermediate speakers.

At the tertiary level, Islamic Studies is taught at Qatar University, and at Hamad Bin Khalifa University’s (HBKU) Faculty of Islamic Studies where a master's degree is offered. Sheikha Moza bint Nasser, the consort of the Father Emir and mother of current Emir, is the most notable graduate.

Education City is also home to the Center for Islamic Legislation and Ethics (CILE), a think tank founded in 2012 and headed by Swiss political philosopher Professor Tariq Ramadan of the University of Oxford.

Islam’s role in scientific discovery has also been an area of interest for the Qatar Foundation, and recently, the Society for Muslim Scientists was established with prominent members. In 2010, the joint venture between Bloomsbury Publishing and Qatar Foundation began, which saw them publish the book, ‘Science in Islam’.

Hinduism 

Hindus make up 15.1% of Qatar. There are an estimated 422,118 Hindus in the country.  Many Hindus are from South and Southeast Asia.

Christianity 
 
The Christian community in Qatar is a diverse mix of European, North and South American, Asian, Middle Eastern and African expatriates. They form around 14% of the total population (2010). No foreign missionary groups operate openly in the country. In May 2005, the Qatari Government leased a piece of property on the outskirts of Doha to the representatives of Christian churches in the country for the construction of Church buildings. A 2015 study estimates some 200 believers in Christ from a Muslim background, though not all of those are necessarily citizens.

Buddhism 

Buddhism is represented by 3.0% of the population of Qatar, mainly comprising migrant workers from South-East Asia.

See also 
Freedom of religion in Qatar
History of the Jews in Qatar

References

External links
 About Qatar

 
Human rights in Qatar